The Steinbachtal Dam is a dam in the city of Euskirchen, North Rhine-Westphalia south of .

History 
The dam was built due to pressure from the Euskirchen cloth industry, who by the late 1920s was no longer able to meet its water needs from the natural streams in the area. Problems included the water quality, which was heavily polluted by waste from the Mechernich lead mining industry. Additionally, the amount of water available was no longer sufficient to drive the turbines for hydroelectric power. The Steinbach Reservoir Association was founded in 1933 to carry out the construction and ongoing operation of the dam. Construction work began in February 1934 and finished in 1936. A 16km cast-iron pipeline, was built to transport the water to the town of Euskirchen and Kuchenheim.

The lake, which has a maximum depth of 17.4m, is now a popular local recreation area. The dam structure of the reservoir was made of coarse-stone with a clay seal on the water side. It is operated by the Zweckverband Steinbachtalsperre/Wasserversorgungsverband Euskirchen-Swisttal.

From September 1988 to 1990, the dam was redeveloped. Recommissioning began on 27 April 1990. The water side was equipped with a 0.80 m thick concrete layer and two asphalt layers.

2021 flood 
During the continuous rain in mid-July 2021 the spillways capacity was to small and the earthen dam over-topped for around three hours. Large parts of the air side washed away and the dam was in danger of bursting due to the heavy load. Potential evacuations were announced for other regions along the Erft, especially Erftstadt and Kerpen. 
The stones washed away from the dam settled below the bottom outlet and blocked it. 

The situation calmed down after the blockage was able to be resolved and a controlled outflow was made possible; additionally several units of the fire brigade and the Federal Agency for Technical Relief (THW) pumped out water.

Evacuation was lifted after five days when the reservoir was nearly empty.

See also 
 List of dams and reservoirs in Germany

Bibliography 
 Andreas Dix: Industrialisierung und Wassernutzung. Eine historisch-geographische Umweltgeschichte der Tuchfabrik Ludwig Müller in Kuchenheim (= Beiträge zur Industrie- und Sozialgeschichte. Bd. 7). Rheinland-Verlag GmbH, Köln 1997, ISBN 3-7927-1600-3 (Zugleich: Bonn, Univ., Diss., 1993).
 , Format: PDF, KBytes: 871

Gallery

References

External links 

 List of dams in NRW (PDF; 122 kB)
 History of the dam

Dams in North Rhine-Westphalia
Reservoirs in North Rhine-Westphalia
Dams completed in 1936